Ryen Depot is the main depot for the Oslo Metro, and is located at Ryen in Oslo, Norway. The depot contains  of buildings and has space for 120 trains, and consists of an workshop, inspection hall and a storage hall. It opened in 1966.

Facilities
The depot is located along the Lambertseter Line, between the line and European Route E6. It has ten tracks, with room for 120 cars. The inspection hall is used for smaller repairs and preemptive work, while the main workshop is used for larger repairs, such as mechanical and electric work on the bodies, bogies and motors.

History
The original plans for the metro called for four smaller depots and a central workshop for both the trams and the metro at Etterstad, near Helsfyr Station. Following the 1960 decision to close the Oslo Tramway, it was decided that a common depot for the metro would be best, and an area at Ryen was purchased. The depot was taken into use at the same time as the Lambertseter was converted to and became the first line of the metro. From 1971, the area at Etterstad was taken into use as an operations central for both the city tramway, the Lilleaker Line, the Ekeberg Line and the metro. During the 1980s, some of the trains were stored at the end tunnels of the Furuset Line and the Grorud Line.

References
Notes

Bibliography

Oslo Metro depots
1966 establishments in Norway